Alhassan Umar is a Ghanaian politician and member of the Seventh Parliament of the Fourth Republic of Ghana representing the Zabzugu Constituency in the Northern Region on the ticket of the National Democratic Congress.

Early life 
Alhassan was born on 29 June 1966 in Zabzugu on the Northern region of Ghana.

Education 
He holds a Master of Business Administration from the University of Phoenix, a BA Biological Science the State University of NJ, Rutgers University. He also holds a Diploma Teachers Certificate from Gambaga Training College.

References

Ghanaian MPs 2017–2021
Year of birth missing (living people)
Living people
University of Phoenix alumni
National Democratic Congress (Ghana) politicians